Neil Mendoza is a British new media artist known for his kinetic and installation artworks.

Work
A number of Mendoza's artworks rely on a combination of computer technologies and actuators to produce artistic effects.  These electromechanical  systems often uses humor, absurdity and futility as strategies to engage viewers.

Exhibitions
Mendoza's works  have been widely exhibited, including exhibitions at Oi Futura in Brasil, the Victoria and Albert Museum, London and the Barbican, London.

References

British artists
Year of birth missing (living people)
Living people